The men's 110 metres hurdles event at the 2016 Summer Olympics took place between 15–16 August at the Olympic Stadium. Forty athletes from 27 nations competed. The event was won by Omar McLeod of Jamaica, the nation's first gold medal and second medal overall (after a bronze four years earlier) in the event. Orlando Ortega's silver was Spain's first medal in the men's high hurdles, while Dimitri Bascou's bronze was France's first medal in the event since 1976. 

For the first time, American hurdlers competed, but failed to win a medal: the other occasion there were no American medalists was in 1980, when the United States boycotted the Olympics.

Background

This was the 28th appearance of the event, which is one of 12 athletics events to have been held at every Summer Olympics. The 2012 Olympic champion Aries Merritt did not return after failing at the American Olympic Trials primarily due to a congenital kidney issue diagnosed in 2013 and undergoing kidney transplant in 2015. Olympic medallists David Oliver and Jason Richardson also did not compete. With Sergey Shubenkov absent due to the Russian team's doping ban and an injury to Hansle Parchment, none of the 2012 Olympic or 2015 World Championships podium athletes was present. The top entrant was Omar McLeod, who held the season-leading time of 12.98 seconds and won 60 m hurdles gold at the 2016 World Indoor Championships. Devon Allen, an American college football player, was his nation's trials winner and ranked second globally on 13.03 seconds, just ahead of Cuban-Spaniard Orlando Ortega. France and the United States provided the next fastest entrants in Dimitri Bascou, Pascal Martinot-Lagarde, Ronnie Ash and Jeff Porter.

Laos and Serbia each made their first appearance in the event (however, Serbia's predecessor nations Yugoslavia and Serbia and Montenegro had appeared before). The United States made its 27th appearance, most of any nation (having missed only the boycotted 1980 Games).

Summary

The final started with all eight competitors reaching the first hurdle virtually at the same time.  In the center of the track Omar McLeod touching down fractionally ahead of Dimitri Bascou and Pascal Martinot-Lagarde the two Frenchmen who sandwiched him and Milan Trajkovic in lane 8.  Going into the second hurdle Bascou gained the fractional edge, but the three in the center of the track ran almost in synchronization for five hurdles, pulling away from the rest of the field.  By the sixth hurdle, McLeod had again gained the fractional edge.  McLeod continued smoothly but Martinot-Lagarde hit the sixth hurdle and Bascou was awkward going into the seventh hurdle giving McLeod the break away.  Over the next two hurdles, McLeod extended his lead as Orlando Ortega and Ronnie Ash began to emerge ahead of the row of hurdlers across the track.  Ash hit the ninth hurdle so badly when he arrived at the tenth hurdle he was short, his lead foot hitting the barrier at toe level, knocking the hurdle over and knocking Ash off balance, still in third place but falling.  McLeod continued to finish with more than a metre lead over Ortega.  Bascou had the lead over his teammate Martinot-Lagarde and American footballer Devon Allen.  Ash took several awkward steps and somersaulted over the finish line in last, only to be disqualified for not properly clearing the hurdle.

The following evening the medals were presented by Richard Peterkin, IOC member, Saint Lucia and Bernard Amsalem, Council Member of the IAAF.

Qualification

A National Olympic Committee (NOC) could enter up to 3 qualified athletes in the men's 110 metres hurdles event if all athletes meet the entry standard during the qualifying period. (The limit of 3 has been in place since the 1930 Olympic Congress.) The qualifying standard was 13.47 seconds. The qualifying period was from 1 May 2015 to 11 July 2016. The qualifying time standards could be obtained in various meets during the given period that have the approval of the IAAF. Only outdoor meets were accepted. NOCs could also use their universality place—each NOC could enter one male athlete regardless of time if they had no male athletes meeting the entry standard for an athletics event—in the 110 metres hurdles. The maximum number of athletes per nation had been set at 3 since the 1930 Olympic Congress.

Competition format

The competition was divided into three rounds: a heats stage with five races, three semifinal races, and a final. The top three from each heat qualified for the semifinal, plus the nine fastest non-qualifiers. The top two finishers from each of the semifinals qualified for the final, as did the next two fastest hurdlers.

The first two heats in the first round were run in the rain. It was determined the non-qualifiers from those heats were disadvantaged in time comparison, and those athletes were allowed to run in a repechage round to improve their qualifying time. Two athletes, Deuce Carter and Alexander John, had been disqualified for failure to properly clear hurdles in those earlier races and were allowed to re-enter. Carter qualified for the semifinals from the special race.

Records

Prior to this competition, the existing world, Olympic, and area records were as follows.

Schedule

All times are Brasilia Time (UTC-3)

Results

Round 1
Qualification rule: first 4 of each heat (Q) plus the 4 fastest times (q) qualified.

Heat 1

Heat 2

Heat 3

Petr Svoboda was originally disqualified under Rule 168.7. His advancement later to the semifinals indicates a reversal of that decision.

Heat 4

Heat 5

Repechage

Semifinals

Semifinal 1

Semifinal 2

Semifinal 3

Final

References

Men's 110 metres hurdles
2016
Men's events at the 2016 Summer Olympics